The 2021 Summit League men's basketball tournament was the postseason men's basketball tournament for the Summit League for the 2020–21 season. All tournament games were played at the Sanford Pentagon in Sioux Falls, South Dakota, from March 6–9, 2021.

Fourth-seeded Oral Roberts defeated third-seeded North Dakota State, 75-72, to claim their fourth Summit League title and earn the automatic bid to the NCAA tournament.

Seeds
The top eight teams by conference record in the Summit League competed in the conference tournament. Teams were seeded by record within the conference, with a tiebreaker system to seed teams with identical conference records. The tiebreakers operate in the following order:
 Head-to-head record.
 Record against the top-seeded team not involved in the tie, going down through the standings until the tie is broken.

Schedule and results

Bracket

All-Tournament Team
The following players were named to the All-Tournament Team:

References

Tournament
Summit League men's basketball tournament
Basketball competitions in Sioux Falls, South Dakota
College basketball tournaments in South Dakota
Summit League men's basketball tournament
Summit League men's basketball tournament